Mark Dawson is a self-published English author. He writes the John Milton series of thriller novels.

Dawson runs the "Self Publishing Formula", which calls itself a "one-stop shop for everything you need to know about self publishing". He hosts a podcast, The Self Publishing Show.

Personal life 
Dawson was born and raised in Lowestoft, Suffolk, and studied law at Manchester University. Before becoming an author, he was a lawyer.

He lives in the Salisbury, Wiltshire area.

Works 

John Milton Series
 The Cleaner (2013)
 Saint Death (2014)
 The Driver (2014)
 Ghosts (2014)
 The Sword of God (2014)
 Salvation Row (2014)
 Headhunters (2015)
 The Ninth Step (2016)
 The Jungle (2016)
 The Blackout (2017)
 The Alamo (2017)
 Redeemer (2018)
 Sleepers (2018)
 Twelve Days (2018)
 Bright Lights (2019)
 The Man Who Never Was (2020)
 Killa City (2020)
 Ronin (2020)
 Never Let Me Down Again (2021)
 Bulletproof (Release Date 1 Oct 2021)

John Milton Novellas
 1000 Yards (2013)
 Tarantula (2014)

Beatrix Rose Series
 In Cold Blood (2015)
 Blood Moon Rising (2015)
 Blood and Roses (2015)
 Phoenix (2017)
 Tempest (2019)

Beatrix Rose Novellas
 White Devil (2015)
 Nine Dragons (2015)
 Dragon Head (2015)

Isabella Rose Series
 The Angel (2015)
 The Asset (2016)
 The Agent (2017)
 The Assassin (2018)
 The Avenger (2022)

Group 15 Series
 Scorpion (2017)
 Witness X (2017)
 Little Sister (2018)
 The Vault (2020)

Soho Noir Thrillers
 The Black Mile (2013)
 The Imposter (2013)
 Gaslight (2014)

Standalone Novels
 The Art of Falling Apart (2012)
 Subpoena Colada (2013)

Atticus Priest Series
 The House in the Woods (2020)
 A Place to Bury Strangers (2021)

Sales figures for The Cleaner
In 2020, Dawson's book The Cleaner reached number 8 in the Hardback Fiction section of The Sunday Times bestseller list after he purchased 400 copies of the book, seeing it to have previously been in position number 13. Nielsen BookScan initially approved the sales, believing them to have been part of a virtual book signing. The book was removed from the list and the list was recalculated after Dawson mentioned placing the order on his podcast The Self Publishing Show, his stated intention being to find overseas readers to purchase the book copies from him.

References

External links

Living people
Year of birth missing (living people)
English male writers
English thriller writers
People from Wiltshire
21st-century English lawyers
Alumni of the University of Manchester
People from Lowestoft